The Hero Honda Karizma R is a motorcycle is an successor of Hero Honda Karizma . It was  launched  Hero Honda Karizma R  in 2007 and was given a cosmetic upgrade Karizma R in 2007. In September 2009, it was supplemented by another variant Karizma ZMR with Programmed fuel injection. After separation of Hero Honda joint venture, They Relaunched the same Hero Honda Karizma R model in 2012 as Hero Karizma and Karizma R got a refresh on 2014 with cosmetic change, Clip on handle bar setup and performance changes.

Design and styling
Honda seems to have contributed a lot in the 'blending' starting with the styling being inspired by Honda VFR800. The instrument panel and the tank recesses were also designed keeping their functionality in mind. The horn came under criticism for not being loud enough. In the initial models, the rear tyre was smaller, resulting in critical reviews which were addressed in the upgrade of 2014 and also The styling is inspired by Honda CBF600.

Comfort and handling
The sporty seating position is similar to Honda CBZ 125 F and BMW F650. Reviews have praised the handling of Karizma as "being easy for novice", "impeccable on straights and cornering" and as an "accomplished bike" in ride and handling. However the rear tyre, the handle bar and the foot pegs have been blamed in affecting the handling in the first models.

Performance and fuel economy
Karizma has the Original Honda's tried and tested, but slightly detuned version of 223 cc SOHC air-cooled engine from the CRF230 series of enduro/MX/supermoto bikes that are sold in the US and South American markets. It has a five-speed gearbox in place of the CRF's six-speed. The engine is an all-aluminium, undersquare engine (bore  and stroke ) running a compression ratio of 9:1. It features a Kehlin CV carburettor with a CCVI switch. The top speed is around 130 km/h and the 0–60 km/h is achieved around 3.8 seconds. The Karizma is reported to have an overall fuel economy of 40 km/L (90 mpg or 2.4 L/100 km), with a best of 50 km/L (120 mpg) and a worst of 28 km/L (66 mpg).

Hero MotoCorp relaunched of Karizma R in 2014, After the separation of Hero Honda Joint Venture. The bike has been praised by many due to its affordable maintenance costs and its ability to endure long trips despite the lack of water-cooling system. Due to its joint partnership with Honda, many of its parts such as fuel pump, rear brake pads, spark plug are compatible with prominent Honda models and can be sourced by international owners on online marketing sites such as Amazon and Ebay. Due to its revered history, there has been reporting to indicate that Hero plans to relaunch the model with higher engine size to compete with other established brands.

References

Related bikes
Hero Honda Ambition 135 
Hero Honda Super Splendor 
Hero Honda Splendor 
Hero Honda Hunk 
Hero Passion 
Hero Pleasure 
Hero Honda Achiever 
Honda Shine 
Honda Unicorn 
Hero Honda CBZ 
Hero Honda Karizma 
Hero Honda Karizma ZMR
Honda Activa

External links

Karizma ZMR official website
Karizma R official website
Hero Honda Karizma

Karizma R
Motorcycles introduced in 2003
Standard motorcycles